Dracontium pittieri is a species of flowering plant native to Costa Rica. It is similar in appearance to Dracontium gigas, but has a substantially longer peduncle, which is the longest of any plant in its genus, between five and eight times the length of its spathe.

References 

pittieri
Endemic flora of Costa Rica
Plants described in 1898